The 1932 All-Ireland Senior Camogie Championship was the high point of the 1932 season in Camogie. The championship was won by Dublin, who defeated Galway by a nine-point margin in the final for a historic first success in a new championship. The match was played alongside a senior hurling challenge between Galway and Cork at Galway Sportsgrounds on July 30, 1933.

Structure
Sean O'Duffy had donated a trophy for inter-county competition but previous efforts to stage an All Ireland championship in 1911, 1917, 1923 and 1928 had not been successful. The 1932 championship, the first to be completed, was organised on an open draw basis, a format that was to be restored to camogie in 1974. Ten counties entered the championship, which were supposed to take place during the summer of 1932. The entire series was postponed until the autumn due to the Tailteann Games and the difficulties of Wexford in fielding a team, causing it to overrun to the summer of 1933. Because inter-county camogie was a new experience, county teams took the field in the colours of their county champions or a co-operative club. Cork used the gymfrocks of the UCC club.

Trophy
Seán O'Duffy donated a silver cup for the All-Ireland Championship to be known from August 1933 as the O'Duffy Cup. The trophy was hand-crafted by silversmiths in Weirs of Dublin.

Semi-finals
Jean Hannon scored five goals for Dublin in their 8–1 to 1–1 semi-final defeat of Wexford with the other goals coming from Maura McGuinness, Ita McNeill and Dillon Bowden. Galway beat Louth by 4–3 to 4–2 in the second semi-final, a closely fought game that did much to popularise the new championship.

Change of Referee
JJ McDonnell (Meath) was appointed to referee the match but did not officiate. Stephen Jordan the Athenry-based TD, who had refereed the hurling match did so instead and became the first person to referee All-Ireland senior hurling and camogie finals.

Final
Dublin held a trial match the weekend before the final in which Jean Hannon scored eight goals as the B team defeated the A team by 10–1 to 4–1. Galway held a trial match on the Tuesday before the game. Dublin travelled by train from Broadstone at 2.15 on the Saturday was met at Galway by members of the GAA and local camogie clubs. A major reception had been planned by Galway City Council for the camogie players and the Cork hurling team, which were making their first visit to Galway as All Ireland champions. The players were preceded by two bands and in a torchlit procession on the Oranmore Road to the Royal Hotel in Eyre Square where they were staying.

Final
The elaborate preparations were all in vain. The rain was so bad on the day of the final that the event, which was anticipated to attract between 6,000 and 10,000 spectators was attended by fewer than 1,000 sodden souls, including Urban Council Members JT Costello, W Sammon, M O'Flaherty, Frank Kelly, JS Young, J Redington and JK Browne. Cork won a (shortened) hurling challenge. When the camogie match went ahead after a debate, Dublin won the toss and tore into attack. The first score in an All Ireland final was registered by Jean Hannon of Dublin. Dublin's team included four Wicklow based players, Eileen Windsor, Jean Hannon, Dillon Bowden and Queenie Dunne, members of the Bray United club, which participated in Dublin competitions at the time.

Presentation
Seán O'Duffy donated a cup for the competition. As Máire Gill was both President of the Camogie Association and captain of the winning team, Seán O'Duffy presented his cup to her after the game.

Championship Results

First round

Final stages

 
 Match Rules
40 minutes
Replay if scores level
No substitutions except in case of injury

See also
 All-Ireland Senior Hurling Championship
 Wikipedia List of Camogie players
 National Camogie League
 Camogie All Stars Awards
 Ashbourne Cup

References

External links
 Camogie Association
 Historical reports of All Ireland finals
 All-Ireland Senior Camogie Championship: Roll of Honour
 Camogie on facebook
 Camogie on GAA Oral History Project

1932 in camogie
1932